John Lennon (born 1996) is an Irish hurler who plays for Laois Senior Championship club Rosenallis and at inter-county level with the Laois senior hurling team. He usually lines out at midfield.

Honours

University of Limerick
Fitzgibbon Cup (1): 2018

Rosenallis
Laois Intermediate Hurling Championship (1): 2016

Laois
Joe McDonagh Cup (1): 2019

References

External links
Ryan Mullaney profile at the Laois GAA website

1996 births
Living people
Rosenallis GAA hurlers
Laois inter-county hurlers